Magoye is a constituency of the National Assembly of Zambia. It covers the village of Magoye and surrounding areas in Mazabuka District of Southern Province.

List of MPs

References 

Constituencies of the National Assembly of Zambia 
1968 establishments in Zambia
Constituencies established in 1968